The Turtle River is a river in Vilas County and Iron County in the state of Wisconsin in the United States.  Its source is South Turtle Lake near Winchester.  It flows into the Turtle-Flambeau Flowage.Little Turtle River Flowage is a 30 acre lake located in Iron County. It has a maximum depth of 4 feet.

Historically the Turtle River was an important part of an extensive network of canoe routes linked by short land portages, used by the Ojibwe and fur traders.  In modern times the river and the lakes it connects are popular recreational waterways.

References

External links

Rivers of Wisconsin
Bodies of water of Vilas County, Wisconsin
Rivers of Iron County, Wisconsin